Andrew Irving (born 13 May 2000) is a Scottish professional footballer who plays as a midfielder for Austrian Bundesliga club  Austria Klagenfurt. He has previously played for Heart of Midlothian, Berwick Rangers, Falkirk and Türkgücü München.

Early life 
Irving grew up in Edinburgh and attended Portobello High School.

Club career

Heart of Midlothian
In June 2017, a member of Heart of Midlothian's (Hearts) Under 20 team, Irving joined Berwick Rangers on loan until January 2018. In all he made 24 appearances for Berwick, scoring twice in all competitions.

On his return he made his first team debut for Heart of Midlothian (Hearts) on 24 January 2018, playing from the start in a 3–0 victory against Hamilton Academical at New Douglas Park. In January 2018, Irving signed a new contract, extending his stay at the club until 2020.

Irving made his first appearance of the 2018–19 season, as a 65th-minute substitute for Olly Lee in a Scottish League Cup tie with Cove Rangers. Irving's contract extension had not been correctly lodged with the Scottish Football Association, rendering him ineligible to play as his registration had expired on 9 June. An SPFL disciplinary hearing took place on Monday 23 July, as a result of which Hearts were deducted two points from the group stages and fined £10,000, with £8,000 of the fine suspended until the end of the next season.

On 31 July 2018, Irving was loaned to Scottish Championship side Falkirk until January 2019.

Türkgücü München 
In June 2021, Irving signed for 3. Liga side Türkgücü München after the expiration of his contract at Hearts.
On 25 July 2021, Irving made his debut for Türkgücü München coming off the bench in a 0–0 draw against SC Verl in the 3. Liga away from home.

SK Austria Klagenfurt 

In July 2022, Irving signed for Austrian Bundesliga outfit SK Austria Klagenfurt

International career
Irving has represented Scotland at the under-17, under-19 and under-21 levels.

Career statistics

References

2000 births
Living people
Heart of Midlothian F.C. players
Scottish Professional Football League players
Berwick Rangers F.C. players
Footballers from Edinburgh
Scottish footballers
Association football midfielders
Falkirk F.C. players
3. Liga players
Türkgücü München players
Scotland youth international footballers
Scotland under-21 international footballers
Scottish expatriate footballers
Expatriate footballers in Germany
Scottish expatriate sportspeople in Germany